Exobasidium burtii is a species of fungus in the family Exobasidiaceae. It is a plant pathogen.

References

Fungal plant pathogens and diseases
Ustilaginomycotina
Fungi described in 1934